Tinocallis is a genus of aphids in the subfamily Calaphidinae.

References

External links 
 
 Tinocallis at insectoid.info

Sternorrhyncha genera
Panaphidini